The Stavanger Symphony Orchestra (SSO) is a symphony orchestra based in Stavanger, Norway.  The SSO principal venue is the Stavanger Concert Hall (Stavanger konserthus), performing in the Fartein Valen concert hall.

History
The Norwegian Broadcasting Corporation founded the orchestra in 1938 as the Stavanger musikerforenings orkester, for radio broadcasts.  The orchestra's first artistic leader was the violinist Gunnar Knudsen, from 1938 to 1945.  In 1965, the orchestra's name was changed to the Symfoniorkestret i Stavanger, and again in 1982 to its present name.

Past artistic leaders of the orchestra have included Susanna Mälkki (2002–2005), and more recently the American conductor Steven Sloane (2007–2013).  Christian Vásquez was chief conductor from 2013 to 2019.  In addition to its chief conductor, the SSO has appointed conductors with a formal principal responsibility for early music programming, including Frans Brüggen (1990–1997), Philippe Herreweghe, and since 2006, Fabio Biondi.  In June 2019, the SSO announced the appointment of Andris Poga as its next chief conductor, effective with the 2021–2022 season.  Tianyi Lu became the SSO's conductor-in-residence for the 2021-2022 season.

The SSO has recorded commercially for such labels as BIS, including music of Harald Sæverud, Geirr Tveitt and Fartein Valen.

Artistic leaders and chief conductors
 Gunnar Knudsen (1938–1945)
 Karsten Andersen (1945–1963)
 Bjørn Woll (1963–1989)
 Aleksandr Dmitriev (1990–1998)
 Ole Kristian Ruud (1999–2002)
 Susanna Mälkki (2002–2005)
 Steven Sloane (2007–2013)
 Christian Vásquez (2013–2019)
 Andris Poga (2021–present)

Early music programme directors
 Frans Brüggen (1990–1997)
 Philippe Herreweghe
 Fabio Biondi (2006–2017)

References

External links
 Official orchestra site
 Store Norske leksikon entry on the orchestra
 Music Web International review of BIS CD-1162, Harald Sæverud, Symphony No. 5 and other works, 5 July 2005.
 Music Web International review of BIS CD-1632, "Fartein Valen: Orchestral Music, Volume 2", 9 April 2009.

Norwegian orchestras
Symphony orchestras
Musical groups established in 1938
1938 establishments in Norway
Musical groups from Stavanger